Skiles Test Nature Park, sometimes called Skiles Test Nature Area is a park on the east side of Indianapolis, Indiana, United States. It is in the northern trailhead of the Fall Creek Parkway and loved by hikers, bikers and nature enthusiasts. The land, originally owned by millionaire Skiles Test, was willed to Indianapolis after his death. His house is supposedly a haunted house known as the House of Blue Lights.

Skiles Test, a local business man, lived on the property from 1913 to 1964. The property once had a miniature railway and a pool with bathhouses, elevators, and high dives.

In 2010 Big Car organized series of site specific art installations in the park including works by Cindy Hinant, Nathan Monk, and  Lukas Schooler.

See also
List of parks in Indianapolis

Further reading
Kobrowski, Nicole Encyclopedia of Haunted Indiana 2008.

References

Parks in Indianapolis
1964 establishments in Indiana